Marcel Marnat (born 6 July 1933) is a French musicologist, journalist and radio producer.

Biography 
After a scientific training, he collaborated in the writing of various cultural newspapers and magazines (Combat, Jazz Hot, Arts, Les Lettres Françaises, L'Express, Preuves, Le Monde, Disques, Harmonie, Le Monde de la musique, Nouvelle Revue Française). He writes on current affairs, art, cinema, literature and lists new discographic publications. He was also secretary of the Ravel Foundation and compiled a catalogue of works by Maurice Ravel.

Marcel Marnat was responsible for programming at France Musique from 1978 to 1992 and has been working since 1990 with the Radio Suisse Romande-Espace 2. He was awarded the prize for music criticism. His book on Giacomo Puccini was honoured by the Académie des Beaux-Arts and received the prix Pelléas as well as a prize for musical biography of the SACEM at the Deauville book festival.

Publications 
 Maurice Ravel, Fayard, 1986
 Haydn, la mesure de son siècle, Fayard, 1995
 Stravinsky, Éditions du Seuil, 1995
 Antonio Vivaldi, Fayard, 2003
 Giacomo Puccini, Fayard, 2006
 Publications about Modest Mussorgsky, Michelangelo, D. H. Lawrence, Paul Klee and Ludwig van Beethoven.

References

External links 
 Marcel Marnat on Éditions Fayard
 Notice biographique on WebThéâtre
 Marcel Marnat on France Culture
 Interview with Marcel Marnat (22 February 2003) on INA.fr
 Marcel Marnat at Diskogs
 Stravinsky et la musique française, intervention de Marcel Marnat on Dailymotion
 Joseph Haydn. La mesure de son siècle by Marcel Marnat (August 1996)

20th-century French musicologists
20th-century French journalists
Radio France people
1933 births
Living people
French biographers